Budanpur is a village 35 km east of Azamgarh, Uttar Pradesh, India.

Villages in Azamgarh district